The Bonaire National Marine Park or BNMP is one of the oldest marine reserves in the world. It includes the sea around Bonaire and Klein Bonaire from the high water line to a depth of sixty meters. The park was established in 1979 and covers 2700 hectares (6700 acres) and includes a coral reef, seagrass, and mangrove vegetation. The lagoon Lac is also part of the underwater park.

In 1999 the underwater park received the status of national park from the Netherlands Antilles. The uninhabited island Klein Bonaire was added to the underwater park as a legally protected nature reserve in 2001. The west side of Bonaire is littered with diving sites that are easily accessible from the beach. The dive sites around Klein Bonaire are accessible by boat for divers. With the exception of a small area, the BNMP is completely open to divers with a total of 86 public dive sites.

Geography 

The national park covers the waters around Bonaire from the high water mark to a depth of 60 meters. Also some coastal stretches with mangrove forests, for example in the lagoon Lac. Part of the park is also the uninhabited island Klein Bonaire. The national park also contains several important wetlands, which are particularly protected under the Ramsar Convention.
In general Bonaire reef ecosystem has fewer macroalgae, a higher coral cover and more young corals per square metre than comparable reefs on UNESCO List of World Heritage in Danger such as Belize Barrier Reef Reserve System.

Flora and Fauna

Open Water 
The flora and fauna of the open water off the coast of Bonaire are not well researched. The water, as typical of the region, is quite warm and contains few natural nutrients, but large quantities of phytoplankton live in this area. Large fish occasionally observed in this area include tuna, wahoo, marlin and swordfish. Also whale sharks  have already been spotted in the waters.

Seabed 

At the bottom of the Bonaire National Marine Park are extensive seagrass beds, which are of the seagrass species Thalassia testudinum and Syringodium filiforme and green algae  of the genus Halimeda dominated. In the seagrass beds one can find a nursery for reef fish and a foraging ground for endangered queen conch and green turtles as well. For many species of fish they are important for the egg-laying and rearing of their young. In addition, large populations of marine snails, such as beautiful flamingo tongue snails (Cyphoma gibbosum) live here.

Coral Reefs 
Bonaire is surrounded by fringing reefs. These consist of about 60 different coral species, including brain corals, elkhorn corals, fire corals and gorgonians. The reefs offer a variety of marine life. Some of the most common fish species are surgeonfish, parrotfish, reefperch and wrasses. In addition, countless invertebrates such as shrimp, crayfish and squid live here. Bonaire's coral reefs were seriously damaged in 1999 by hurricane Lenny. Furthermore, they are threatened by the effects of pollutants and the warming of the sea.

Lac bay 
In the lagoon of Lac Bay is the only significant concentration of mangroves on Bonaire. Here grow red, black and white mangrove as well as button mangrove. The 700-acre lagoon has been a Ramsar site since the 1980s, offering habitat to green sea turtle and other endangered species, such as queen conch (Strombus gigas).

Tourism 
Already in 1939, the famous diving pioneer Hans Hass visited Bonaire and reported in his books on the rich underwater world.
 Bonaire National Marine Park known as one of the hotspots for divers in the Caribbean and as one of the world's best places for snorkeling. For example, Forbes magazine ranked BNMP among the top 10 must-dive destinations in the world in 2017. In the Bonaire Marine Park, Dixon et al. (1994) found that most divers seldom venture further than 300 m in one direction and that there was a decreasing physical impact on reef communities with increasing distance from a mooring buoy. Analyzing coral cover, they estimate that the diver carrying capacity threshold for the Bonaire Marine Park is between 4000 and 6000 dives per site per year.J.A. Dixon et al. (1994) Ecology and microeconomics
as joint products: the Bonaire Marine Park in the Caribbean. In: C. Perrings, et al. (eds) Biodiversity conservation: problems and politics. Kluwer Academic Press, Dordrecht In addition, various activities such as kitesurfing, sailing and windsurfing are offered in the area of the Bonaire National Marine Park. 
Unique to the Bonaire National Marine Park is that it runs entirely on its own income (without subsidies). The income comes from an entrance fee for divers. Other users, such as swimmers, surfers, kite boarders, kayakers and water sports enthusiasts, pay a lower entrance fee. This also gives access to the Washington Slagbaai National Park. In addition to nature protection, the BNMP provides information about responsible diving to tourists and the maintenance of moorings (buoys) for boats with divers. The management is in the hands of the Stichting Nationale Parken Bonaire (STINAPA) which also manages the Washington Slagbaai National Park.

See also 
Environmental issues with coral reefs#Caribbean
List of reefs

References

External links 
 Bonaire National Marine Park

Protected areas established in 1979
Protected areas of Bonaire
Nature conservation in the Netherlands